Ľubomír Bernáth (born 3 September 1985) is a Slovak football forward.

He previously played for ŠK Eldus Močenok and FC Spartak Trnava.

References

1985 births
Living people
Slovak footballers
FC Spartak Trnava players
FC ViOn Zlaté Moravce players
Slovak Super Liga players
Association football forwards
Sportspeople from Nitra